The 2018 United States House of Representatives elections were held on November 6, 2018, as part of the 2018 midterm elections during President Donald Trump's term, with early voting taking place in some states in the weeks preceding that date. Voters chose representatives from all 435 congressional districts across each of the 50 U.S. states to serve in the 116th United States Congress. Non-voting delegates from the District of Columbia and four of the five inhabited U.S. territories were also elected. On Election Day, Republicans had held a House majority since January 2011.

In the 2018 elections, the Democrats, led by Nancy Pelosi, won control of the House. The Democrats gained a net total of 41 seats from the total number of seats they had won in the 2016 elections. The 41-seat gain was the Democrats' largest gain of House seats since the post-Watergate 1974 elections, when they picked up 49 seats. This was the first time since 1954 that Democrats flipped a chamber of Congress in a Republican president's first midterm. Its also the last time the Democrats won a house seat in Utah or Oklahoma.

Upon the opening of the 116th Congress, Pelosi was elected as Speaker of the House. Incumbent Republican House Speaker Paul Ryan chose not to run for another term. In November 2018, House Republicans elected Kevin McCarthy as House Minority Leader.

The House Republicans' passage of the widely unpopular American Health Care Act of 2017 to repeal the Affordable Care Act, as well as opposition to Trump's policies, his poor approval ratings, and questions about his personal stamina for office, are credited for the Democratic takeover of the House.

Results summary and analysis

Federal
The Democratic Party won control of the House of Representatives in the 2018 midterm elections. The Democrats gained a net total of 41 seats from the total number of seats they had won in the 2016 elections. This was their largest gain of House seats in an election since the 1974 elections, when the Democrats gained 49 House seats. Democrats won the popular vote by more than 9.7 million votes, or 8.6%, the largest midterm margin for any party and the largest margin on record for a minority party.

According to the Associated Press' statistical analysis, gerrymandering cost the Democrats an additional sixteen House seats from Republicans.

Voter turnout in this election was 50.3%, the highest turnout in a U.S. midterm election since 1914.

Note that the results summary does not include blank and over/under votes which were included in the official results or votes cast in the voided election in North Carolina's 9th congressional district.

Per states

Maps

Retirements 

In the November general elections, fifty-four incumbents did not seek re-election, either to retire or to seek other positions.

Democrats 
Eighteen Democrats did not seek re-election.
: Kyrsten Sinema retired to run for U.S. Senator.
: Jared Polis retired to run for Governor of Colorado.
: Elizabeth Esty retired after involvement in sexual harassment allegations against an employee.
: Colleen Hanabusa retired to run for Governor of Hawaii.
: Luis Gutiérrez retired.
: John Delaney retired to run for U.S. President.
: Niki Tsongas retired.
: Sander Levin retired.
: Tim Walz retired to run for Governor of Minnesota. 
: Keith Ellison retired to run for Minnesota Attorney General.
: Rick Nolan retired to run for Lieutenant Governor of Minnesota.
: Jacky Rosen retired to run for U.S. Senator.
: Rubén Kihuen retired due to sexual harassment allegations.
: Carol Shea-Porter retired.
: Michelle Lujan Grisham retired to run for Governor of New Mexico.
: Bob Brady retired after being redistricted from the 1st district.
: Beto O'Rourke retired to run for U.S. Senator.
: Gene Green retired.

Republicans 
Thirty-seven Republicans did not seek re-election.

: Martha McSally retired to run for U.S. Senator.
: Ed Royce retired.
: Darrell Issa retired, nominated by President Donald Trump to be the Director of the United States Trade and Development Agency.
: Ron DeSantis retired to run for Governor of Florida.
: Dennis Ross retired.
: Tom Rooney retired.
: Ileana Ros-Lehtinen retired.
: Raúl Labrador retired to run for Governor of Idaho.
: Todd Rokita retired to run for U.S. Senator.
: Luke Messer retired to run for U.S. Senator.
: Lynn Jenkins retired.
: Dave Trott retired.
: Gregg Harper retired.
: Frank LoBiondo retired "due to the increased political polarization of Congress."
: Rodney Frelinghuysen retired.
: Steve Pearce retired to run for Governor of New Mexico.
: Kevin Cramer retired to run for U.S. Senator.
: Jim Renacci retired to run for U.S. Senator.
: Jim Bridenstine announced his retirement November 10, 2017. He resigned April 23, 2018, after being confirmed as Administrator of NASA; his replacement was seated November 6, 2018.
: Ryan Costello retired due to "family, the political environment and redistricting."
: Lou Barletta, redistricted from the 11th district, retired to run for U.S. Senator.
: Bill Shuster retired when redistricted from the 9th district.
: Trey Gowdy retired to "return to the justice system."
: Kristi Noem retired to run for Governor of South Dakota.
: Jimmy Duncan retired.
: Diane Black retired to run for Governor of Tennessee.
: Marsha Blackburn retired to run for U.S. Senator.
: Ted Poe retired.
: Sam Johnson retired.
: Jeb Hensarling retired.
: Joe Barton retired.
: Lamar Smith retired.
: Tom Garrett retired due to alcoholism.
: Bob Goodlatte retired.
: Dave Reichert retired.
: Evan Jenkins retired to run for U.S. Senator and then resigned to become State Supreme Court Justice. 
: Paul Ryan retired.

Resignations and death
Four seats opened early due to resignations or death and were not filled until the November elections.

Democrats 
One Democrat resigned and one died.
 : John Conyers resigned. Brenda Jones won the special election to complete Conyers's term.
 : Louise Slaughter died.

Republicans 
Two Republicans resigned.
 : Pat Meehan resigned when redistricted from the 7th district.
 : Charlie Dent resigned when redistricted from the 15th district.

Incumbents defeated

In primary elections

Democrats 
Three Democrats (including one non-voting delegate) lost renomination.

 : Delegate Madeleine Bordallo lost renomination to Michael San Nicolas, who went on to win the general election.
 : Mike Capuano lost renomination to Ayanna Pressley, who went on to win the general election.
 : Joe Crowley lost renomination to Alexandria Ocasio-Cortez, who went on to win the general election.

Republicans 
Two Republicans lost renomination.

 : Robert Pittenger lost renomination to Mark Harris. A new special election was ordered due to electoral fraud conducted by associates of Republican Harris's campaign.
 : Mark Sanford lost renomination to Katie Arrington, who went on to lose the general election to Joe Cunningham (D).

In the general election

Democrats 
No Democrats lost re-election to Republicans.

Republicans 
Thirty Republicans lost re-election to Democrats.

 : Jeff Denham (first elected in 2010) lost to Josh Harder.
 : David Valadao (first elected in 2012) lost to TJ Cox.
 : Steve Knight (first elected in 2014) lost to Katie Hill.
 : Mimi Walters (first elected in 2014) lost to Katie Porter.
 : Dana Rohrabacher (first elected in 1988) lost to Harley Rouda.
 : Mike Coffman (first elected in 2008) lost to Jason Crow.
 : Carlos Curbelo (first elected in 2014) lost to Debbie Mucarsel-Powell.
 : Karen Handel (first elected in 2017) lost to Lucy McBath.
 : Peter Roskam (first elected in 2006) lost to Sean Casten.
 : Randy Hultgren (first elected in 2010) lost to Lauren Underwood.
 : Rod Blum (first elected in 2014) lost to Abby Finkenauer.
 : David Young (first elected in 2014) lost to Cindy Axne.
 : Kevin Yoder (first elected in 2010) lost to Sharice Davids.
 : Bruce Poliquin (first elected in 2014) lost to Jared Golden.
 : Mike Bishop (first elected in 2014) lost to Elissa Slotkin.
 : Jason Lewis (first elected in 2016) lost to Angie Craig.
 : Erik Paulsen (first elected in 2008) lost to Dean Phillips.
 : Tom MacArthur (first elected in 2014) lost to Andy Kim.
 : Leonard Lance (first elected in 2008) lost to Tom Malinowski.
 : Dan Donovan (first elected in 2015) lost to Max Rose.
 : John Faso (first elected in 2016) lost to Antonio Delgado.
 : Claudia Tenney (first elected in 2016) lost to Anthony Brindisi.
 : Steve Russell (first elected in 2014) lost to Kendra Horn.
 : Keith Rothfus (first elected in 2012) lost a redistricting race to Conor Lamb.
 : John Culberson (first elected in 2000) lost to Lizzie Fletcher.
 : Pete Sessions (first elected in 1996) lost to Colin Allred.
 : Mia Love (first elected in 2014) lost to Ben McAdams.
 : Scott Taylor (first elected in 2016) lost to Elaine Luria.
 : Dave Brat (first elected in 2014) lost to Abigail Spanberger.
 : Barbara Comstock (first elected in 2014) lost to Jennifer Wexton.

Open seats that changed parties

Democratic seats won by Republicans 
Three open Democratic seats were won by Republicans.
 : won by Jim Hagedorn.
 : won by Pete Stauber.
 : Conor Lamb instead ran in the 17th district; won by Guy Reschenthaler.

Republican seats won by Democrats 
Thirteen open Republican seats were won by Democrats.
 : won by Ann Kirkpatrick.
 : won by Gil Cisneros.
 : won by Mike Levin.
 : won by Donna Shalala.
 : won by Haley Stevens.
 : won by Jeff Van Drew, who later became a Republican on December 19, 2019.
 : won by Mikie Sherrill.
 : won by Xochitl Torres Small.
 : won by Mary Gay Scanlon.
 : won by Chrissy Houlahan.
 : won by Susan Wild.
 : won by Joe Cunningham.
 : won by Kim Schrier.

Open seats that parties held

Democratic seats held by Democrats 
Democrats held nineteen of their open seats.

 : won by Greg Stanton.
 : won by Joe Neguse.
 : won by Jahana Hayes.
 : won by Ed Case.
 : won by Chuy García.
 : won by David Trone.
 : won by Lori Trahan.
 : won by Andy Levin.
 : won by Rashida Tlaib.
 : won by Ilhan Omar.
 : won by Susie Lee.
 : won by Steven Horsford.
 : won by Chris Pappas.
 : won by Deb Haaland.
 : won by Joe Morelle.
 : Bob Brady retired; won by Brendan Boyle.
 : won by Veronica Escobar.
 : won by Sylvia Garcia.

Republican seats held by Republicans 
Republicans held twenty-eight of their open seats.

 : won by Michael Waltz.
 : won by Ross Spano.
 : won by Greg Steube.
 : won by Russ Fulcher.
 : won by Jim Baird.
 : won by Greg Pence.
 : won by Steve Watkins.
 : won by Michael Guest.
 : won by Kelly Armstrong.
 : won by Anthony Gonzalez.
 : won by Kevin Hern.
 : won by Dan Meuser.
 : won by John Joyce.
 : won by William Timmons.
 : won by Dusty Johnson.
 : won by Tim Burchett.
 : won by John Rose.
 : won by Mark Green.
 : won by Dan Crenshaw.
 : won by Van Taylor.
 : won by Lance Gooden.
 : won by Ron Wright.
 : won by Chip Roy.
 : won by Denver Riggleman.
 : won by Ben Cline.
 : won by Carol Miller.
 : won by Bryan Steil.

Resignations 
Three other members announced their retirements but then resigned early before their terms ended.

 : Blake Farenthold (R) announced his retirement December 14, 2017. He resigned on April 6, 2018. His seat was filled by a special election for the remainder of the term.
 : Jason Chaffetz (R) announced his retirement April 19, 2017. He resigned on June 30, 2017. His seat was filled by a special election for the remainder of the term.
 : Evan Jenkins (R) announced his retirement May 8, 2017, to run for U.S. Senator. He lost the nomination and then resigned September 30, 2018, when appointed to the Supreme Court of Appeals of West Virginia. His seat was not filled until the regular election for the next congress.

Closest races 
In eighty-nine races, the margin of victory was under 10%.

Election ratings

Special elections 

Elections ordered by election date.

|-
! 
| Tim Murphy
| 
| 2002
| data-sort-value=03/13/2018  | Incumbent resigned October 21, 2017.New member elected March 13, 2018.Democratic gain.
| nowrap | 

|-
! 
| Trent Franks
| 
| 2002
|  | Incumbent resigned December 8, 2017.New member elected April 24, 2018.Republican hold.
| nowrap | 

|-
! 
| Blake Farenthold
| 
| 2010
|  | Incumbent resigned April 6, 2018.New member elected June 30, 2018.Republican hold.
| nowrap | 

|-
! 
| Pat Tiberi
| 
| 2000
|  | Incumbent resigned January 15, 2018.New member elected August 7, 2018.Republican hold.
| nowrap | 

|-
! 
| John Conyers
| 
| 1964
|  | Incumbent resigned December 5, 2017.New member elected November 6, 2018.Democratic hold.
| nowrap | 

|-
! 
| Louise Slaughter
| 
| 1986
|  | Incumbent died March 16, 2018.New member elected November 6, 2018.Democratic hold.
| nowrap | 

|-
! 
| Pat Meehan
| 
| 2010
| data-sort-value=11/06/2018  | Incumbent resigned April 27, 2018.New member elected November 6, 2018.Democratic gain.
| nowrap | 

|-
! 
| Charlie Dent
| 
| 2004
| data-sort-value=11/06/2018  | Incumbent resigned May 12, 2018.New member elected November 6, 2018.Democratic gain.
| nowrap | 

|}

Voter demographics 

Source: Edison Research exit poll for the National Election Pool

Election dates 
For the regularly scheduled November elections.

Alabama 

The state congressional delegation remained the same, at 6–1 for Republicans.

Alaska 

Republicans maintained control of the sole seat in the state.

Arizona 

The state congressional delegation flipped from a 5–4 Republican majority to a 5–4 Democratic majority.

Arkansas 

The state congressional delegation remained the same with a 4–0 Republican majority.

California 

The Democratic majority increased from 39–14 to 46–7.

Colorado 

The state congressional delegation flipped from a 4–3 Republican majority to a 4–3 Democratic majority.

Connecticut 

The state congressional delegation remained unchanged at 5–0 Democrats.

Delaware 

Democrats retained control of the sole seat in the state.

Florida 

The Republican majority was reduced from 16–11 to 14–13.

Georgia 

The Republican majority was reduced from 10–4 to 9–5.

Hawaii 

Hawaii maintained its 2-0 Democratic hold.

Idaho 

Idaho maintained its 2-0 Republican hold.

Illinois 

The Democratic majority increased from 11–7 to 13–5.

Indiana 

The Republican majority remained at 7–2.

Iowa 

Iowa's delegation flipped from a 3–1 Republican majority to a 3–1 Democratic majority.

Kansas 

The Republican majority slipped from 4–0 to 3–1.

Kentucky 

Republicans maintained their 5–1 majority.

Louisiana 

All incumbents were re-elected, and Republicans maintained their 5–1 majority.

Maine 

The 1–1 tie became a 2–0 Democratic hold.  This was the first use of ranked choice voting to decide a House race.

Maryland 

Democrats maintained their 7–1 majority.

Massachusetts 

Democrats maintained their 9–0 hold.

Michigan 

The delegation flipped from a 9–5 Republican majority to a 7–7 split.

Minnesota 

Although half of the seats switched parties, Democrats maintained the same 5–3 majority.

Mississippi 

The Republicans maintained their 3-1 majority in the state.

Missouri 

The Republicans maintained their 6-2 seat majority.

Montana 

Republicans maintained control of the lone house seat.

Nebraska 

Republicans maintained their 3-0 majority.

Nevada 

Democrats maintained their 3-1 majority.

New Hampshire 

The Democrats maintained control of both house seats.

New Jersey 

The state congressional delegation changed from 7–5 for Democrats to 11–1 for Democrats.

New Mexico 

The state congressional delegation changed from 2–1 for Democrats to all 3 seats controlled by Democrats.

New York 

Democrats increased their seat majority in New York's congressional delegation from 18–9 to 21–6.

North Carolina 

Due to allegations of electoral fraud, the 116th Congress was sworn in with one seat vacant. On February 21, 2019, a new election was ordered by the state election board.

North Dakota 

Republicans maintained control of the sole house seat.

Ohio 

The state congressional delegation remained the same at 12–4 for Republicans.

Oklahoma 

The state congressional delegation changed from 5–0 for Republicans to a 4–1 Republican majority.

Oregon 

The state congressional delegation remained the same, with a 4–1 Democratic majority.

Pennsylvania 

As a result of changes in the congressional map, the state congressional delegation changed from a 13–5 Republican majority to a 9–9 split.

Rhode Island 

The state congressional delegation remained unchanged at 2–0 for Democrats.

South Carolina 

The state congressional delegation changed from 6–1 for Republicans to 5–2 for Republicans.

South Dakota 

Republicans retained control of the sole seat in the state.

Tennessee 

Republicans maintained their 7-2 seat majority.

Texas 

The state congressional delegation changed from a 25–11 Republican majority to a 23–13 Republican majority.

Utah 

The state congressional delegation changed from 4–0 for Republicans to a 3–1 Republican majority.

Vermont 

The Democrats maintained control of the sole seat in the state.

Virginia 

The state congressional delegation flipped from a 7–4 Republican majority to a 7–4 Democratic majority.

Washington 

Democrats increased their seat majority from 6–4 to 7–3.

West Virginia 

The state congressional delegation remained the same at 3–0 for Republicans.

Wisconsin 

Republicans maintained their 5-3 seat majority.

Wyoming 

Republicans maintained control of the sole seat in the state.

Non-voting delegates

American Samoa

District of Columbia

Guam

Northern Mariana Islands 

The election for a non-voting delegate from the Northern Mariana Islands was postponed until Tuesday, November 13, 2018 due to the impact of Typhoon Yutu.

Puerto Rico 

The Resident Commissioner of Puerto Rico is not up for re-election until 2020. Currently held by Republican Jenniffer González, who was first elected in 2016, the Resident Commissioner is the only member of the United States House of Representatives to serve a four-year term.

United States Virgin Islands

See also
 115th United States Congress
 116th United States Congress
 List of new members of the 116th United States Congress
 2018 United States elections
 2018 United States gubernatorial elections
 2018 United States Senate elections

Notes

References